Vexillum alvinobalani is a species of small sea snail, marine gastropod mollusk in the family Costellariidae, the ribbed miters.

Description
The length of shell varies between 30 mm and 35 mm.

Distribution
This marine species occurs off the Philippines.

References

External links
 Guillot de Suduiraut E. 1999. Description de Vexillum (Costellaria) alvinobalani des Philippines (Gastropoda: Muricoides: Costellariidae) Apex, 14(1): 15-19

alvinobalani
Gastropods described in 1999